The 1966 Vanderbilt Commodores football team represented Vanderbilt University in the 1966 NCAA University Division football season. The Commodores were led by head coach John Green in his fourth and final season and finished the season with a record of one win and nine losses (1–9 overall, 0–5 in the SEC).

Schedule

Source: 1966 Vanderbilt football schedule

References

Vanderbilt
Vanderbilt Commodores football seasons
Vanderbilt Commodores football